Philiris intensa is a species of butterfly of the family Lycaenidae. It is found on the Aru Islands, from West Irian to Papua, the Louisiade Archipelago, the Trobriand Archipelago, the Bismarck Archipelago, the Moluccas and Buru.

Subspecies
Philiris intensa intensa (Aru, from West Irian to Papua, the Louisiades, Trobriand, Bismarck Archipelago)
Philiris intensa birou Wind & Clench, 1947 (New Guinea: Morobe district)
Philiris intensa butleri (Grose-Smith & Kirby, 1897) (Moluccas: Halmaheira, Batchian, Gilolo)
Philiris intensa ilioides Cassidy, 2003 (Buru)

References

Butterflies described in 1876
Luciini
Butterflies of Asia
Butterflies of Oceania
Taxa named by Arthur Gardiner Butler